Reading Anthracite Company is a coal mining company based in Pottsville, Pennsylvania in the United States. It mainly mines anthracite coal in the Coal Region of eastern Pennsylvania.

The company owns the Bear Valley Strip Mine in Northumberland County, Pennsylvania.

History

Reading Anthracite Company; origins date back to 1871 when its predecessor, the Philadelphia and Reading Coal and Iron Company (P. & R. C.& I.) was chartered. As a large publicly traded concern, P. & R. C. & I. had diverse industrial interests which revolved primarily around its main business of railroading. P. & R. C. & I. changed its corporate title in 1956 to The Philadelphia & Reading Corporation, of which Reading Anthracite Company was one of its many operating divisions. In 1961, Philadelphia & Reading Corporation divested itself of its anthracite coal interests, selling the Reading Anthracite company to its present owners.

The unionized mine suffered an on-the-job fatality in July 2017.

References

External links
Reading Anthracite Company website
Historic Images of Philadelphia and Reading Coal and Iron Company at the Hagley Library Digital Archives

Archives and records
Philadelphia and Reading Coal and Iron Company photograph albums at Baker Library Special Collections, Harvard Business School.

Companies based in Schuylkill County, Pennsylvania
Coal companies of the United States
Companies established in 1871
1871 establishments in Pennsylvania